Heterogynis thomas is a moth in the Heterogynidae family. It was described by Alberto Zilli in 1987.

References

Heterogynidae
Moths described in 1987